Frédéric Erin (born 23 April 1980) is a retired New Caledonian long jumper.

He won several gold medals at small regional events such as the South Pacific Games, the South Pacific Mini Games, the Arafura Games and the Oceania Athletics Championships.

New Caledonia not being a member of all athletics governing bodies, Erin could also represent France. He competed at the 2012 European Championships without reaching the final, and also became French champion the same year. He also won the Australian and New Zealand championships.

His personal best jump was 8.12 metres, achieved in September 2011 in Nouméa. This is the New Caledonian record

References

External links
 

1980 births
Living people
New Caledonian male athletes
French male long jumpers